Francisco Costa may refer to:

 Francisco Costa (designer) (born 1964), Brazilian designer
 Francisco Costa (tennis) (born 1973), Brazilian tennis player
 Francisco Costa (handballer) (born 2005), Portuguese handball player
 Francisco José Fernandes Costa (1867–1925), Portuguese lawyer and politician